Artists who are frequently considered postminimalist include:

Vito Acconci (1940-2017)
Rodney Carswell (born 1946)
Christine Corday (born 1970)
Tom Friedman (born 1965)
Felix Gonzalez-Torres (1957-1996)
Mona Hatoum (born 1952)
Eva Hesse (1936-1970)
Damien Hirst (born 1965)
Anish Kapoor (born 1954)
Gary Kuehn (born 1939)
Wolfgang Laib (born 1950)
Robert Morris (1931-2018)
Keith Milow (born 1945)
Bruce Nauman (born 1941)
Joseph Nechvatal (born 1951)
Gabriel Orozco (born 1962)
Martin Puryear (born 1941)
Charles Ray (born 1953)
Joel Shapiro (born 1941)
Santiago Sierra (born 1966)
Robert Smithson (1938-1973)
Keith Sonnier (1941-2020)
Cecil Touchon (born 1956)
Richard Tuttle (born 1941)
Richard Wentworth (born 1947)
Rachel Whiteread (born 1963)
Hannah Wilke (1940-1993)
Anne Wilson (born 1949)
Jackie Winsor (born 1941)
Xurban collective

References

Postminimalist
Postminimalist artists